Statistics of Liberian Premier League in season 1984.

Overview
It was contested by 8 teams, and Invincible Eleven won the championship.

References
Liberia - List of final tables (RSSSF)

Football competitions in Liberia